Sopot railway station is the main railway station serving the city of Sopot, in the Pomeranian Voivodeship, Poland. The station opened in 1870 and is located on the Gdańsk–Stargard railway and the parallel Gdańsk Śródmieście–Rumia railway. The train services are operated by PKP, Polregio and SKM Tricity. Koleje Mazowieckie trains operate here during the summer.

General information
The station features two island platforms, of which one functions as the regional commuter SKM stop and the other for long-distance services. The platforms are accessible through two underpasses, one of which connects both tracks. The ticket offices are open all day long.

History

The station was built in the years 1868–1870. The railway reached Sopot from Gdańsk (11.7 km) on 1 July 1870. On 1 September of the same year the line from Slupsk and Gdynia (119.5 km) reached Sopot.

In 1907 the first overpass in Sopot was built at ul. Podjazd and in 1909 a pedestrian tunnel was built.

In 1884 the railway station was used by 134,709 passengers. In 1925 this was 11x greater with 1,522,672 passengers. For comparison, at the station Gdańsk Główny in the same year 3,445,006 tickets were sold. In 1909 Sopot had direct train connections from Berlin, Bydgoszcz, Konigsberg, St. Petersburg, Poznan, Szczecin, Torun and Warsaw.

In 1912 the first work began for the construction of a separate pair of tracks for urban traffic from Gdańsk Główny towards Sopot. The work interrupted by the outbreak of World War I. This line was completed between Gdańsk and Sopot Wyścigi in 1925. After World War II, in 1950, it was decided to continue work on the separation of suburban traffic. In 1952 SKM arrived in Sopot and a year later, on 22 July 1953 it was extended to Gdynia (one track). On 1 May 1954 the second track was opened.

Station building

Identical or similar stations were built in Gdańsk-Wrzeszcz, Gdańsk Oliwa, Gdynia Chylonia, Reda, Wejherowo and probably in Lębork. Most of the pre-war station and buildings no longer exist, except for the original platform roofs. In 1945, the original station building was burned down by Soviet troops advancing along the railway tracks on Danzig (Gdansk) from Gdynia in the northwest. In the area of the station resistance was encountered and strongly suppressed. In 1947, the station was rebuilt and the ground floor of the old main building saw the construction in 1972 of the functional/social-realist second station building.

Modernisation
The functionalist 1970s ticket building was torn down in 2013 to make way for a complete redevelopment of the entire station and its surrounding area. This development project was completed and opened on 18 December 2015 after some delays. The station area is now known as Sopot Centrum.

Train services
The station is served by the following services:

EuroCity services (EC) (EC 95 by DB) (IC by PKP) Gdynia - Gdansk - Bydgoszcz - Poznan - Rzepin - Frankfurt (Oder) - Berlin
EuroCity services (EC) Gdynia - Gdansk - Malbork - Warsaw - Katowice - Bohumin - Ostrava - Prerov - Breclav - Vienna
Express Intercity Premium services (EIP) Gdynia - Warsaw
Express Intercity Premium services (EIP) Gdynia - Warsaw - Katowice - Gliwice/Bielsko-Biała
Express Intercity Premium services (EIP) Gdynia/Kołobrzeg - Warsaw - Kraków (- Rzeszów)
Intercity services (IC) Gdynia - Gdansk - Bydgoszcz - Poznań - Wrocław - Opole - Katowice - Kraków - Rzeszów - Przemyśl
Intercity services (IC) Gdynia - Gdańsk - Bydgoszcz - Toruń - Kutno - Łódź - Częstochowa - Katowice - Bielsko-Biała
Intercity services (IC) Gdynia - Gdańsk - Bydgoszcz - Łódź - Czestochowa — Krakow — Zakopane
Intercity services (IC) Gdynia - Gdańsk - Bydgoszcz - Poznań - Zielona Góra
Intercity services (IC) Gdynia - Gdańsk - Bydgoszcz - Poznań - Wrocław 
 Intercity services (IC) Łódź Fabryczna — Warszawa — Gdańsk Glowny — Kołobrzeg
Intercity services (IC) Szczecin - Koszalin - Słupsk - Gdynia - Gdańsk
Intercity services (IC) Szczecin - Koszalin - Słupsk - Gdynia - Gdańsk - Elbląg/Iława - Olsztyn
Intercity services (IC) Szczecin - Koszalin - Słupsk - Gdynia - Gdańsk - Elbląg - Olsztyn - Białystok
Intercity services (TLK) Gdynia Główna — Kostrzyn 
Intercity services (TLK) Gdynia Główna — Warszawa — Krakow — Zakopane 
Intercity services (TLK) Kołobrzeg — Gdynia Główna — Warszawa Wschodnia — Kraków Główny
Regional services (R) Tczew — Gdynia Chylonia 
Regional services (R) Tczew — Słupsk  
Regional services (R) Malbork — Słupsk  
Regional services (R) Malbork — Gdynia Chylonia 
Regional services (R) Elbląg — Gdynia Chylonia 
Regional services (R) Elbląg — Słupsk  
Regional services (R) Chojnice — Tczew — Gdynia Główna 
Regional services (R) Gdynia Chylonia — Olsztyn Główny
Regional services (R) Gdynia Chylonia — Smętowo 
Regional services (R) Gdynia Chylonia — Laskowice Pomorskie 
Regional services (R) Gdynia Chylonia — Bydgoszcz Główna 
Regional services (R) Słupsk — Bydgoszcz Główna 
Regional services (R) Gdynia Chylonia — Pruszcz Gdański 
Pomorska Kolej Metropolitalna services (R) Kościerzyna — Gdańsk Port Lotniczy (Airport) — Gdańsk Wrzeszcz — Gdynia Główna
Szybka Kolej Miejska services (SKM) (Lębork -) Wejherowo - Reda - Rumia - Gdynia - Sopot - Gdansk

References 

 This article is based upon a translation of the Polish language version as of October 2016.

External links

Sopot at Google Local

Railway stations in Poland opened in 1870
Railway stations served by Szybka Kolej Miejska (Tricity)
Sopot
Railway stations served by Przewozy Regionalne InterRegio